Jack Muller (27 December 1919 – 26 December 1977) was an Australian rules footballer who played with Geelong in the Victorian Football League (VFL).

Notes

External links 

1919 births
1977 deaths
Australian rules footballers from Victoria (Australia)
Geelong Football Club players
North Geelong Football Club players